Oleksandr Stepanyan (born 10 January 1968) is a retired Armenian-Ukrainian Greco Roman wrestler. He competed at the 2000 Summer Olympics.

References

External links
 Stepanyan, Olexander (UKR)

1968 births
Living people
Armenian wrestlers
Ukrainian male sport wrestlers
Wrestlers at the 2000 Summer Olympics
Olympic wrestlers of Ukraine
Ukrainian people of Armenian descent